Gen. William H. Kerr House is a historic home located on Deal Road (formerly Beatties Ford Road), near Enochville, Rowan County, North Carolina.

The house was built between 1817 and 1820, and is a two-story, three bay, Federal style frame dwelling.  It has a rebuilt front porch and one-story ell and shed dating to the late 1930s.  It was listed on the National Register of Historic Places in 1982.

William Kerr, of Scots-Irish descent, was a member of the Rowan County Militia and in December 1817 he became colonel of the 7th Brigade of the North Carolina Militia. In 1827 Kerr was promoted to the rank of brigadier general of the 7th Brigade.  He was born in 1778 (probably in VA), died in 1844 (while living at the above dwelling), and is buried at Centre Presbyterian Church Cemetery in Mooresville, Iredell County, North Carolina.

References

Houses on the National Register of Historic Places in North Carolina
Federal architecture in North Carolina
Houses completed in 1820
Houses in Rowan County, North Carolina
National Register of Historic Places in Rowan County, North Carolina